In the run up to the 2018 Turkish general election scheduled to take place on 24 June 2018, various organisations carry out opinion polling to gauge voting intention in Turkey. Results of such polls are displayed in this article. These polls only include Turkish voters nationwide and do not take into account Turkish expatriates voting abroad. The date range for these opinion polls are from the previous general election, held on 1 November 2015, to the present day.

Presidential election

First round

Graphical summary

Following candidate selection

Prior to candidate selection

Abroad

Second round

Official candidates

Erdoğan vs. Akşener

Erdoğan vs. İnce

Hypothetical candidates

Erdoğan vs. Gül

Erdoğan vs. Kılıçdaroğlu

Parliamentary election
Poll results are listed in the tables below in reverse chronological order, showing the most recent first, and using the date the survey's fieldwork was done, as opposed to the date of publication. If such date is unknown, the date of publication is given instead. The highest percentage figure in each polling survey is displayed in bold, and the background shaded in the leading party's colour. In the instance that there is a tie, then no figure is shaded. The lead column on the right shows the percentage-point difference between the two parties with the highest figures. When a specific poll does not show a data figure for a party, the party's cell corresponding to that poll is shown empty.

Graphical summary

Party vote

 Domestic vote only

Abroad

Alliance vote

Following formation of alliances

Prior to formation of alliances

Seat projections

Parties

Alliances

References

2018 Turkish general election
2018